The Essential Alison Moyet was essentially a third re-release of Singles, the 1995 greatest hits album of recordings by singer/songwriter Alison Moyet. The album was released in 2001 by Sony Music Entertainment in response to renewed interest in the singer, after she was finally released from her contract with the label and able to sign with Sanctuary Records, regain the artistic control of her musical output and move back into the public eye - resulting in 2002 comeback album Hometime.
However, there are some differences in the track listings of the two Sony compilations. The Essential Alison Moyet excludes "Only You", "Situation', "Ordinary Girl", "Ode To Boy II", "The First Time Ever I Saw Your Face" and "Solid Wood", and replaces them with "Don't Go", "Winter Kills", "Blue" and "Our Colander Eyes" (the latter two recorded in 1995/1996, and listed in the wrong order in accompanying material) plus cover versions "Ne Me Quitte Pas" and "There Are Worse Things I Could Do".

Track listing
"Don't Go" (Vince Clarke) - 2:51
 Performed by Yazoo, from 1982 album Upstairs at Eric's
"Nobody's Diary" (Moyet) - 4:31
 Performed by Yazoo, from 1983 album You and Me Both
"Winter Kills" (Alison Moyet) - 4:04
 Performed by Yazoo, from 1982 album Upstairs at Eric's
"Love Resurrection"  (Jolley, Moyet, Swain) - 3:52
 From 1984 album Alf
"All Cried Out" (7" Edit) (Jolley, Moyet, Swain) - 3:42
 From 1984 album Alf
"Invisible" (Lamont Dozier) - 4:08
 From 1984 album Alf
"That Ole Devil Called Love"  (Fisher, Roberts) - 3:05
 1985 non-album single
"Is This Love" (Guiot, Moyet) - 4:01
 From 1987 album Raindancing
"Weak in the Presence of Beauty"  (Michael Ward, Robert E. Clarke ) - 3:33
 From 1987 album Raindancing
"Love Letters" (Heyman, Young) - 2:51
 1987 non-album single
"It Won't Be Long"  (Pete Glenister, Moyet) - 4:09
 From 1991 album Hoodoo
"Wishing You Were Here"  (Glenister, Moyet) - 3:58
 From 1991 album Hoodoo
"This House" (Moyet) - 3:55
 From 1991 album Hoodoo
"Falling" (Glenister, Moyet) - 3:39
 From 1994 album Essex
"Whispering Your Name" (Single Mix) (Shear) - 3:49
 From 1994 album Essex
"Getting Into Something"  (Glenister, Moyet) - 4:15
 From 1994 album Essex
"Blue" (Glenister, Moyet) - 3:21
Recorded 1995, previously issued on single "Solid Wood"
"Our Colander Eyes" (Glenister, Moyet) - 3:32
Recorded 1996, previously issued as promo single.
"Ne Me Quitte Pas" (Acoustic) (Jacques Brel) - 3:45
Previously issued on single "Getting Into Something"
"There Are Worse Things I Could Do" (Casey, Jacobs) - 2:27
Studio version. Previously unreleased.

Production tracks 17-20
 "Blue" - mixed by Bob Kraushaar
 "Our Colander Eyes" - produced by Mike Hedges, mixed by Corin Dingley
 "Ne Me Quitte Pas" - produced by Victor van Vugt
 "There Are Worse Things I Could Do" - engineer Neil Brockbank

References

External links
Alison Moyet's official website

Alison Moyet albums
2001 greatest hits albums
Albums produced by Victor Van Vugt
Columbia Records compilation albums
Sony Music compilation albums